ACS Sporting Turnu Măgurele was a Romanian football club based in Turnu Măgurele, Teleorman County.

History
Sporting was founded in the summer of 2014, by Italian businessman Valter Raffini, the owner of Eurosiloz Company, to continue the football legacy of Turnu Măgurele, after the bankruptcy of Dunărea Turris Turnu Măgurele in 2013.

In the summer of 2016 the club withdrew from Liga III and then was dissolved.

Honours
Liga IV – Teleorman County
Winners (1): 2014–15

References

Association football clubs established in 2014
Association football clubs disestablished in 2016
Defunct football clubs in Romania
Football clubs in Teleorman County
Liga III clubs
Liga IV clubs
2014 establishments in Romania
2016 disestablishments in Romania
Turnu Măgurele